Christopher Whall works in Gloucester Cathedral is a narrative list of works that Christopher Whall executed for Gloucester Cathedral.

Ante-Chapel North

"Man's Fallen State"

"Man's Fallen State"- The Fall and Deprivation of Paradise. Window in the Ante-Chapel North. 1898. This was the first window to be completed and at the top of the window are fragments of old glass found during restoration work in 1895.

In this window Whall takes his inspiration from the Creation Story from the Old Testament (Genesis iii) and in the centre light he draws the serpent wound around the Tree of Knowledge in the Garden of Eden.  The inscription reads-"I will put enmity between thee and the woman and between thy seed and her seed".  In the left hand light Whall depicts Eve with a child beside her and in the right hand light an angel in red bars the entrance to the garden. An image of this window is shown above. The memorial note was designed by Veronica Whall and inserted into the window in 1928 recording that the window was given in memory of Henry Bruton, J.P.(1813–1894).

The Restoration in the Sacrament

The Restoration in the Sacrament of the Eucharist. Window in the Ante-Chapel South. 1902. This three-light window links to the "Man's Fallen State" window opposite and through the death and resurrection of Christ we have gone full circle and man and God are now reconciled.  Now Adam and Eve are clothed and kneel as though in contrition and look across at an angel who holds out a chalice in her left hand whilst in her right hand she holds a wheatsheaf. "Man has been restored through the sacrifice of Christ and the Sacrament of the Gospel" is the message and in the centre of his composition Whall depicts wheat stalks and vine leaves (the bread and wine of the Eucharist).

Window was donated in memory of Archdeacon John William Sheringham. When Archdeacon he had raised a large amount of money for
the Cathedral's restoration.

North Nave

"The Childhood of The Blessed Virgin Mary"
Window 1. This being the first large window on the North Nave side of the Lady Chapel. "The Childhood of The Blessed Virgin Mary". 1901

"The Annunciation"
Window 2. This being the second large window on the North Nave side. "The Annunciation" 1901

The window was given by Baron de Ferrieres of Cheltenham. The inscription reads "Erected to the glory of God for the beautifying of His House in heartfelt gratitude for 75 years of continued and undeserved mercies".

Notice the little stained glass windows in the lower lights, a window within a window. Also note in bottom right hand corner by the dedication a small jug, a compass and carpenter's square with the initials P G-D, K T. R and S, these being of students and workmen who helped with the painting and fixing.

"The Salutation"

Window 3. This being the first large window on the South Nave side. "The Salutation". 1902

A note in the glass points out that this is one of four windows inserted 1900–02 when Dr. Spence was dean.

"The Nativity"
Window 4. This is the second large window on the south nave side. "The Nativity". 1909

This window was given by William Long J.P.of Gloucester in memory of his wife Anne.

"The Reconciliation of Man to God through the Incarnation"
Window 5.This being the large window on the North side of the Chancel. "The Reconciliation of Man to God through the Incarnation".1909

This window was given in memory of Charles James Monk (1824–1900) by his daughters. In the bottom right-hand corner
of the window are Monk's Arms and the motto "Fortifier, Fideliter. Feliciter". Monk was an M.P.for Gloucester, Chancellor of Bristol 
diocese from 1855 and of Gloucester diocese from 1859. His father James Henry Monk was Bishop of Gloucester 1830-1836 and of Gloucester 
and Bristol until his death in 1856.

South African War Memorial Window, Chapterhouse

Another of Whall's works in Gloucester Cathedral is the magnificent South African War Memorial window, the Great East Window in the Chapter House. Concerning this window,  Whall points out that there is a full description available on a notice board just by the window and he reminds us that the Chapter House was the building in which the Domesday Book was compiled and points out that the lower centre lights of the window represent William the Conqueror directing the compilation of the Book.  He asks us to notice the map hanging over the edge of the table and says that with the help of opera glasses the ancient names of the towns may be read.

The window comprises 18 lights with seven tracery lights above.  It is divided into three groups of six lights each, each group having an upper tier of three and a lower tier of three. Whall explains that he intends the window to depict the "Spirit of the Lord" (Isaiah xi, 2), divided into the two great branches- COUNSEL and MIGHT.

Underneath the window are a series of tablets on which the names of the deceased are recorded. They are of hammered and chased copper, subsequently oxidised with a view to toning the metal, in order to get as far as possible a subdued effect and so to harmonise with the solemn dignity of the Chapter House.  See image below.

In the notice on the wall by the window are the closing words-

"TO THE GLORY OF GOD & IN MEMORY OF THE OFFICERS, NON-COMMISSIONED OFFICERS & MEN OF GLOUCESTERSHIRE & THE COUNTY REGIMENT WHO FELL IN THE WAR IN SOUTH AFRICA,a.d. 1899-1902".

Sixth window
Sixth window by Heaton, Butler and Bayne. 1899. Had the sixth window been elsewhere in the Cathedral it would one suspects have been treated as a typical Victorian window, the sort that Pevsner may have described as "over-sentimental".  Below are some of the angels at the base of the window as well as the dedication.  Whall has already told us that the faces of the angels were based on the faces of the people being remembered.

The South Chantry Chapel
This small South Chantry is reserved by the Cathedral for the remembrance of musicians associated with the Cathedral.
There are two windows by Christopher Whall and a charming set of windows by Veronica in memory of Sir Herbert Brewer. Images are shown below.

Christopher Whall memorial window

Memorial window to Christopher Whall by Veronica Whall. It would seem fitting to conclude the article with this window which is in the wall opposite the fifth window in the Chancel and was by Veronica Whall. It is dedicated to the memory of her father. See image above shown courtesy Rex Harris.

As one looks at the child on St Christopher's shoulders it is tempting to think that in drawing that child
Veronica may have had herself in mind or perhaps thought of all the other aspiring artists who Whall had helped (carried) in their early years. The window was completed in 1926.

Other works
 War Memorial windows
 Works in Scotland
 Cathedrals and Minsters windows

See also 
List of works by Christopher Whall
The works of Veronica Whall

Notes

References

External links
 Excellent and informative website. Much used in writing about the lives of saints in this article.
 Cathedral’s own website with good information on stained glass.
History of Gloucester Cathedral

Further reading
"Gloucester Cathedral Stained Glass". Available from Gloucester Cathedral. 
"Gloucester Cathedral" Text by Lowinger Maddison and edited by Esme West.
"How to Read a Church". A Guide to Images, Symbols and Meanings in Churches and Cathedrals by Richard Taylor. ISBN I 844I 3053 3
"Stained Glass of Gloucester Cathedral" by: Rev Canon David Welander. 
"Stained Glass Work", published in London by John Hogg in 1905.This is now available to read "online "

Christopher Whall
Whall